The Jin River Bridge is a cable-stayed bridge over the Jin River in Quanzhou/ Jinjiang, Fujian, China.

History
The project of Jin River Bridge was officially started on 8 May 2005, completed and put into trial operation on 24 October 2008, with a total investment of about 880 million yuan.

Gallery

References

Bridges in Fujian
Concrete bridges in China
Bridges completed in 2008
Buildings and structures completed in 2008
2008 establishments in China